Ladies in Waiting may refer to:
 Lady-in-waiting
 Ladies in Waiting (film), a 1940 Czech romantic comedy film
 Las Meninas (The Ladies-in-waiting), a 1656 painting by Diego Velázquez
 "Ladies in Waiting", a song by Kiss on their third album, Dressed to Kill